The 1974 Svenska Cupen final took place on 23 May 1974 at Örjans Vall in Halmstad. The match was contested by Allsvenskan sides Malmö FF and Östers IF. Öster played their first cup final ever, Malmö FF played their second consecutive final and their 10th final in total. Malmö FF won their 8th title with a 2–0 victory.

Match details

External links
Svenska Cupen at svenskfotboll.se

1974
Cupen
Malmö FF matches
Östers IF matches
May 1974 sports events in Europe
Sports competitions in Halmstad